Fox is a Spanish television channel owned by Fox Networks Group. The channel broadcasts American imports with Spanish.

In 2023, Fox will become Star Channel as Disney removes Fox brand to avoid confusion with Fox Corporation.

References

External links

Television channels and stations established in 2002
Television stations in Spain
Television in Andorra
Spanish-language television stations
2002 establishments in Spain
Spain